This is a list of journals published by Institution of Engineering and Technology (IET), including those from its predecessors Institution of Electrical Engineers (IEE) and Institution of Incorporated Engineers (IIE).

B

C

E

H

I

J

M

P

R

S

W

External links
IET Digital Library

IET
Institution of Engineering and Technology

Institution of Engineering and Technology